David Ballans (30 June 1868 – 26 June 1957) was an Australian cricketer. He played two first-class matches for South Australia between 1889 and 1893.

See also
 List of South Australian representative cricketers

References

External links
 

1868 births
1957 deaths
Australian cricketers
South Australia cricketers